Weird Mystery Tales was a mystery horror comics anthology published by DC Comics from July–August 1972 to November 1975.

Publication history

100 Page Super Spectacular
The title Weird Mystery Tales was first used for DC 100 Page Super Spectacular #4 in 1971. It reprinted stories from My Greatest Adventure #8, 12, 14, 15, and 20; Sensation Mystery #110 and 116; House of Secrets #2; The Phantom Stranger #1; Tales of the Unexpected #15 and 24; and House of Mystery #49.

Ongoing series
The Weird Mystery Tales ongoing series was launched in July–August 1972 and was originally hosted by Destiny. The hosting role was gradually taken over by Eve, who fully assumed the title with issue #15 (December 1974–January 1975). The title's name was partially inspired by the sales success of Weird War Tales and Weird Western Tales. Early issues printed material by Jack Kirby that had been intended for his black-and-white, magazine-size DC comic series, Spirit World, which lasted only one issue. These stories featured Dr. E. Leopold Maas as host, sometimes with an appended hosting segment by Destiny.

Weird Mystery Tales contributors, in addition to Kirby, included Alfredo Alcala, Tony DeZuniga, Michael Kaluta, Alex Niño, Howard Purcell, Nestor Redondo, Jack Sparling, and Bernie Wrightson. Howard Purcell's last known work in the comics industry was a story each in Weird Mystery Tales #1–3 (Aug.–Dec. 1972), plus the cover of #2.

Ashcan edition 
In 1996, DC published a free ashcan edition titled Weird Mystery Tales, with the tagline, "Welcome to the Dark Side of DC". It was written by Adam Philips and drawn by Anthony Williams.

Collected editions 
 Spirit World includes "Horoscope Phenomenon or Witch Queen of Ancient Sumeria?" from Weird Mystery Tales #1; "Toxl the World Killer!" from Weird Mystery Tales #2; and "The Burners!" from Weird Mystery Tales #3, 108 pages, May 2012, .

References

External links  

Weird Mystery Tales at Mike's Amazing World of Comics

1972 comics debuts
1975 comics endings
1996 comics debuts
1996 comics endings
Comics anthologies
Comics by David Michelinie
Comics by George Kashdan
Comics by Jack Kirby
Comics by Marv Wolfman
Comics by Michael Fleisher
Comics by Paul Levitz
Comics magazines published in the United States
DC Comics one-shots
DC Comics titles
Defunct American comics
Fantasy comics
Horror comics